Mikhail Nikolayevich Smirnovsky was a Soviet diplomat and a specialist in Soviet relations with English-speaking countries.  He was first secretary of the Soviet Embassy in Washington DC in 1953, and served a second time in Washington as the minister-counselor and second-ranking officer of the Embassy at the beginning of the 1960s.  Around 1963 Smirnovsky returned to the Foreign Ministry in Moscow, where he was chief of the USA section of the Ministry.  In 1966 he became Soviet Ambassador to the United Kingdom (with concurrent accreditation in Malta starting in 1967), where he served until 1973. It is believed that he was later, in Moscow, a member of the Foreign Ministry's Collegium, understood to have been an advisory group of senior officers.  He was a player in US-Soviet relations at critical times, including the Cuban Missile Crisis of 1962. Smirnovsky was viewed by American colleagues as an efficient, businesslike diplomat who, in contrast to many other Soviet officials, eschewed rudeness and avoided unnecessary exaggeration.

References

Ambassadors of the Soviet Union to Malta
Ambassadors of the Soviet Union to the United Kingdom
Moscow Aviation Institute alumni
Year of birth missing
Year of death missing
Burials in Troyekurovskoye Cemetery